Pogostemon stellatus is an aquatic perennial herb from eastern and southeastern Asia, the Indian Subcontinent, New Guinea, and northern Australia. Because of its extensive geographic distribution, there are many different color and leaf forms of this plant in the wild. It is a highly prized and sought after aquatic plant in the aquarium trade.

See also
List of freshwater aquarium plant species

References

stellatus
Flora of Asia
Flora of Australia
Plants described in 1891
Aquatic plants
Taxa named by João de Loureiro